Legnica is a railway station in the town of Legnica, Lower Silesia, Poland.

Current building of the station has been opened for the public in 1927 and represents Art Deco style in architecture. It is one of few stations in Poland which has a large hall of steel-glass.

Train services
Train services are operated by Przewozy Regionalne and Koleje Dolnośląskie.

Until mid-December 2014 the station was also served by EuroCity "Wawel", which used to run once daily between Berlin Hauptbahnhof and Wrocław Główny. The service has been re-established since 2020, now extending further East to Przemyśl near the Ukrainian border.

The station is served by the following service(s):
EuroCity services (EC) (EC 95 by DB) (IC by PKP) Berlin - Frankfurt (Oder) - Rzepin - Wrocław – Katowice – Kraków – Rzeszów – Przemyśl
Intercity services (IC) Zielona Góra - Wrocław - Opele - Częstochowa - Kraków - Rzeszów - Przemyśl
Intercity services (IC) Swinoujscie - Szczecin - Kostrzyn - Rzepin - Zielona Gora - Wroclaw - Katowice - Kraków
 Intercity services (IC) Zgorzelec - Legnica - Wrocław - Ostrów Wielkopolski - Łódź - Warszawa
Intercity services (TLK) Lublin Główny — Świnoujście

References

External links
 
 Przewozy Regionalne website 
 Stacja kolejowa Legnica - Bahnhof Liegnitz, Lignica (do 1947 r.) na portalu polska-org.pl

Railway stations in Lower Silesian Voivodeship
railway station
Railway stations in Poland opened in 1844